System 9 or System IX may refer to:

Computing
 IBM System z9, the mainframe line
 Plan 9 from Bell Labs, the operating system
 Mac OS 9, latest release of Classic Mac OS operating system
 OS-9, the Unix-like real time operating system
 SYSTEM POWER 9, line of power supplies by be quiet!

Other
 STS-9 (Space Transportation System-9), the Space Shuttle mission

See also
 Series 9
 OS9 (disambiguation)